JOCI-DTV, branded as , is a television station in Nagoya, Japan operated by the Aichi Television Broadcasting Company, Ltd. (TVA) and is an affiliate of the TX Network.

Broadcasting

Analog (as of 11/07/24 end date)
JOCI-TV (1983/09/01-11/07/24)
Nagoya: Channel 25
Toyohashi: Channel 52

Digital
JOCI-DTV (2003/12/01)
Channel ID 10
Nagoya: Channel 23
Toyohashi: Channel 26

Programmes (Times in JST)

Now on air
 Ben 10: Alien Force (18:00) - animated television series, aired over Japan 
 Samurai Jack (18:30) - animated television series, aired over Japan
 Nogizakatte, Doko? (24:00) - variety show, aired over Japan 
 SpongeBob SquarePants (10:00) - animated television series, aired over Japan
 Naruto - anime television series, aired over Japan
 The Simpsons (24:00) - animated television series, aired over Japan
 Family Guy (24:30) - animated television series, aired over Japan

Past

in Aichi Prefecture
Bakushō Chokuyunyū Benny Hill Show - broadcasts The Benny Hill Show
Ōsu no Cosplay Monogatari - features cosplayers in Nagoya
News and Wide Maiyū! - local news program
Yattokame Tanteidan - a comedy and mystery anime laid in Nagoya

all over Japan
Anime TV productions
Totsugeki! Pappara-tai
Shin Hakkenden
Cyborg Kuro-chan
Gyōten Ningen Batseelor
Tokyo Mew Mew
Mermaid Melody Pichi Pichi Pitch
Transformer Galaxy Force
Wan Wan Celeb Soreyuke! Tetsunoshin
Deltora Quest
Cardfight!! Vanguard
Future Card Buddyfight
Tokusatsu
Madan Senki Ryukendo
Tomica Hero: Rescue Force
Tomica Hero: Rescue Fire
Foreign
Winx Club
Power Rangers Megaforce
Power Rangers Dino Fury
Soy Luna

Rival TV stations in Nagoya
Tōkai Television Broadcasting (THK, affiliated with CX and FNN / FNS) - 1
Chūkyō Television Broadcasting (CTV, affiliated with NTV and NNN / NNS) - 4
Chubu-Nippon Broadcasting Co., Ltd. (CBC, affiliated with TBS TV and JNN) - 5
Nagoya Broadcasting Network (NBN, affiliated with TV Asahi and ANN) - 6

Website
Official website

Television stations in Nagoya
TX Network
Television channels and stations established in 1983
1983 establishments in Japan
Nikkei Inc.